Luke Rhodes (born December 2, 1992) is an American football long snapper for the Indianapolis Colts of the National Football League (NFL). He played college football at William & Mary.

Professional career

Tampa Bay Buccaneers
Rhodes signed with the Tampa Bay Buccaneers as an undrafted free agent on May 2, 2016. He was released on September 3, 2016 as part of final roster cuts.

Indianapolis Colts
On October 5, 2016, Rhodes was signed to the Indianapolis Colts' practice squad. He was promoted to the active roster on December 7, 2016.

On August 28, 2017, Rhodes was named the Colts' full-time long snapper after making the conversion during training camp. He was competing against rookie Thomas Hennessy for the starting spot while competing for a backup inside linebacker spot.

On April 2, 2018, Rhodes signed an exclusive rights tender with the Colts through the 2018 season.

On June 11, 2019, Rhodes signed a four-year, $4.85 million contract extension with the Colts with $1.25 million guaranteed, making him the highest-paid long snapper in the league.

Rhodes was an Associated Press Second-team All-Pro choice in 2020.

In 2021, Rhodes handled long snapping duties in 16 games for the fifth consecutive season. He was named Associated Press First-team All-Pro. Rhodes also became the first Indianapolis long snapper named to the Pro Bowl since Matt Overton in 2013.

References

External links
William & Mary Tribe bio
Indianapolis Colts bio

1992 births
Living people
Players of American football from Pennsylvania
People from Hollidaysburg, Pennsylvania
American football linebackers
William & Mary Tribe football players
Tampa Bay Buccaneers players
Indianapolis Colts players
American Conference Pro Bowl players